Ansungtangmyun (Hangul: 안성탕면; Hanja: 安城湯麵) is a brand of ramyeon produced by Nongshim in South Korea since 1983, and is the third highest-selling brand of noodles in South Korea. It is made with beef stock from cows in Anseong. In 1992, V Anseongtangmyeon and in 1996, Shrimp Anseongtang-myeon was launched. On June 22, 2005, Anseongtang noodles bowl made of pop-shaped container noodles was released, but it was discontinued due to sluggish sales, and 66g Anseongtang noodles cup was released on September 11, 2010. On September 10, 2018, to mark the 35th anniversary of the sale of Anseongtangmyeon, a new seafood Anseongtangmyeon was launched.

See also

 List of noodles
 List of instant noodle brands

References

External links

Ansungtangmyun - Nongshim 

South Korean brands
Instant noodle brands